The 5mm Bergmann is an unusual centerfire cartridge produced for very early self-loading pocket pistols.  The case is steeply conical and headspaces on the conical case walls.  Early versions (sometimes called the 5 mm Bergmann Rimless) were made without any rim or extraction groove; and relied upon blow-back for expulsion of the fired case from the chamber.  Later Bergmann pistols provided an extractor requiring a groove which produced a semi-rimmed case.  The long bullet was inadequately stabilized and tended to tumble in flight.

References

Pistol and rifle cartridges